Charles Howard Smith  (17 May 1888 – 23 July 1942) was a British diplomat.

Smith was educated at Winchester and Brasenose College, Oxford, before joining the British Foreign Office in 1912. He remained in the diplomatic service throughout World War I and the inter-war period, during which he was private secretary to the then Under-Secretary of State for Foreign Affairs Cecil Harmsworth MP (later Lord Harmsworth) 1920–22. Smith was himself eventually appointed Assistant Under-Secretary for Foreign Affairs in 1933. In October 1939 he took up the position of Minister to Copenhagen, but was forced to leave upon the German invasion of Denmark in April 1940. Following his departure from Copenhagen he became the first British Minister to Reykjavik. He died in his post in July 1942.

References

External links

1888 births
1942 deaths
People educated at Winchester College
Alumni of Brasenose College, Oxford
Ambassadors of the United Kingdom to Denmark
Ambassadors of the United Kingdom to Iceland
Companions of the Order of St Michael and St George